Tony Alford (born November 27, 1968) is an American football coach, currently the running backs and run game coordinator at Ohio State University.  He served as an assistant football coach at several programs throughout the Midwest for 27 years.

Playing career
Alford graduated from Doherty High School in Colorado Springs, Colorado after moving to the area his Senior year from Akron, Ohio. He went on to play for Colorado State from 1987–1990. He was a 1,000-yard rusher and a Doak Walker Award nominee while at Colorado State from 1987–90. He gained 1,035 yards in 1989 as a junior under first-year Rams coach Earle Bruce. Alford was named first-team all-Western Athletic Conference that season and honorable mention All-America by USA Today.

Following his graduation, Alford was on the preseason squad for the Denver Broncos and for the WLAF's Birmingham Fire.

Coaching career
Alford has a long history of coaching success at under several top coaches. He has worked under Dan McCarney, Steve Kragthorpe, Rick Neuheisel, Charlie Weis, Brian Kelly, and Urban Meyer.

He has coached several successful players including J. K. Dobbins, Ezekiel Elliott, Mike Weber, Michael Floyd and Victor Anderson.

Alford was a 247Sports.com finalist for national recruiter of the year in 2011.

Personal life
Alford is married to his wife Trina and has three sons, Rylan, Kyler and Braydon.

References

External links
https://ohiostatebuckeyes.com/coach/tony-alford/ Ohio State profile

1968 births
Living people
American football running backs
Ohio State Buckeyes football coaches
Notre Dame Fighting Irish football coaches
People from Akron, Ohio
African-American coaches of American football
African-American players of American football
Colorado State Rams football players
21st-century African-American people
20th-century African-American sportspeople